Andreas Samaris (born 13 June 1989) is a Greek professional footballer who plays as a midfielder for Primeira Liga club Rio Ave.

After winning the Super League Greece with Olympiakos in 2014, he signed with Benfica in Portugal for €10 million. With them, he has won four Primeira Liga, one Taça de Portugal, two Taça da Liga and two Supertaça Cândido de Oliveira.

A full international since 2013, Samaris represented Greece at the 2014 FIFA World Cup.

Club career

Greece
Samaris started his career in Gamma Ethniki side Panachaiki in 2006, making a total of 37 league appearances and scored three goals for the club. On 10 April 2007, he signed his first professional contract with Panachaiki, where he was coached by future Australia national team manager Ange Postecoglou. On 11 January 2010, Samaris moved to Panionios.

Samaris joined Olympiacos in 2012 but spent the season on loan at Panionios. In 2013, he returned to Olympiacos and scored his first goal with the club on 23 November 2013, in an away 4–1 victory against Panthrakikos. Samaris ended the league with 38 appearances and scored four goals en route to the Greeks' 41st title.

Benfica
On 22 August 2014, Samaris moved abroad and joined Portuguese champions Benfica on a five-year contract for a transfer fee of €10 million and with a €45 million release clause. He made his debut for Benfica on 12 September against Vitória Sétubal.

At the end of the 2014–15 season, Samaris mentioned that the Portuguese language was a barrier in his first year with the club. The Greek international stressed the importance of learning it by stating, "I liked to learn Portuguese because I became closer to my colleagues. The most important is to understand what my coach says because there was an idea of game and I had to adapt faster than the others."

On 29 August 2015, in the second day of 2015–16 Primeira Liga, Samaris, after an assist from Greek teammate Kostas Mitroglou, scored with a right-footed shot from outside the box to the bottom left corner, the second goal giving the lead to his club in a 3–2 win against Moreirense. It was his first goal in the Primeira Liga. On 1 April 2016, he scored his second goal in the Portuguese league, with a direct free kick, in a 5–1 home game against Braga. On 4 March 2017, in a 1–0 away game against C.D. Feirense, Samaris reached 100 appearances with the jersey of Benfica. In that season, he also played in the Taça de Portugal final, which Benfica won over Vitória de Guimarães (2–1).

On 11 March 2019, Samaris scored a volley in a league match, giving his team a two-goal lead in an eventual 2–2 home draw to Belenenses. It was his first goal in the 2018–19 season in all competitions. On 14 May, he extended his contract with Benfica until 2023.
On 21 July 2021, Andreas Samaris starts training with Benfica’s B team today. The 32-year-old Greek international midfielder is not part of Jorge Jesus’ plans and has refused all Benfica’s attempts to negotiate a mutually agreed termination of the contract that runs until 2023. Eventually on 31 August 2021, Samaris agreed with the club for the termination of his contract.

Fortuna Sittard
On 19 November 2021, Fortuna Sittard announced the acquisition of Andreas Samaris until the end of the season. The 32-year-old international midfielder was released last summer and was looking for the next stage of his career, finding a football home in the Eredivisie, has signed a link valid until the end of the current season. The Dutch club in its announcement does not mention anything about a purchase option.  On 27 November 2021, he made his debut with the club as a late substitute in a frustrating 1–4 loss against FC Groningen.

Rio Ave
On 29 August 2022, Samaris returned to Portugal and signed a one-season contract with Rio Ave.

International career
Samaris is a former Greece under-19 international. He made his debut in a 2008 European Under-19 Championship qualifier against France. In October 2013, he was called up to the Greek senior side by manager Fernando Santos and made a substitute appearance in the final group qualifier against Liechtenstein, also coming off the bench in the two play-off matches against Romania. After a strong season with Olympiakos, Santos opted to select Samaris to his final 23-man squad for the 2014 FIFA World Cup.

On 24 June 2014, in his first appearance in a final tournament of the World Cup and against the Ivory Coast, Samaris opened the scoring after capitalizing on Cheick Tioté's defensive mistake in the 42nd minute in an eventual 2–1 victory; Samaris came on as an early replacement for the injured Panagiotis Kone.

Career statistics

Club

International

Honours
Olympiacos
 Super League Greece: 2013–14

Benfica
 Primeira Liga: 2014–15, 2015–16, 2016–17, 2018–19
 Taça de Portugal: 2016–17
 Taça da Liga: 2014–15, 2015–16
 Supertaça Cândido de Oliveira: 2016, 2017

References

External links

 
 
 

1989 births
Living people
Footballers from Patras
Association football midfielders
Greek footballers
Greece youth international footballers
Greece international footballers
Panachaiki F.C. players
Panionios F.C. players
Olympiacos F.C. players
S.L. Benfica footballers
Fortuna Sittard players
Rio Ave F.C. players
Super League Greece players
Primeira Liga players
Eredivisie players
2014 FIFA World Cup players
Greek expatriate footballers
Expatriate footballers in Portugal
Greek expatriate sportspeople in Portugal
Expatriate footballers in the Netherlands
Greek expatriate sportspeople in the Netherlands